A world café is a structured conversational process for knowledge sharing in which groups of people discuss a topic at several small tables like those in a café. Some degree of formality may be retained to make sure that everyone gets a chance to speak. Although pre-defined questions have been agreed upon at the beginning, outcomes or solutions are not decided in advance. The assumption is that collective discussion can shift people's conceptions and encourage collective action. Events need to have at least twelve participants, but there is no upper limit. For example, in Israel in 2011 an event called 1000 Tables was hosted in several cities on a single day as part of a series of social justice protests held around that time, and around a thousand people participated.

Knowledge café 
A knowledge café, as developed by David Gurteen, has no tables, and no themes or questions for each of the small group discussions. Discussion is not led by a facilitator, and no summary is captured for subsequent feedback to the group—the aim is to maximise time spent in conversation, so time spent with one person presenting is minimised.

Modified world café 
Modified world café is a variant developed in 2019 and structured in two rounds which have the same length and an equal number of tables. Each group is provided with a goal to work on and each round is ended by plenary presentation. After the intermediate presentation, all members of each group except one (called the "host") are asked to move their seats to a new table and start a new round of discussion that is concluded by a final plenary presentation. 

Application in Japanese clinical clerkship and postgraduate (residency) clinical teaching showed a relevant increase of the perceived usefulness and consent in respect of the product of the discussion groups.

See also

 Art of Hosting
 Bohm Dialogue
 Dialogue
 Dialogue mapping
 Fishbowl (conversation)
 Learning circle
 Open Space Technology
 Participation (decision making)
 Public consultation
 Speed geeking
 Unconference

References

Further reading

External links
 The World Café website
 The World Café Community website (by subscription)
 The Knowledge Café website

Collaboration
Group decision-making
Knowledge management
Unconferences